Watussi was a Sydney-based band that perform Afro-Colombian rock 'n' roots, with lyrics mainly sung in Spanish. The band's name is slang for "the most handsome man at the party". Their album Tequila, Sangre y Fuego was nominated for the 2008 ARIA Award for Best World Music Album. Lead by Colombian born singer songwriter and producer Oscar Jimenez.

In 2010 fresh back from a South American tour, the began work on the next Album El Olvido with producer Joel Hamilton. The album was released in September 2011.

In 2012, they collaborated with New Orleans legend Jon Cleary with whom they arranged recorded and released the tracks "Che Che Cole" (by Willie Colon's) and "Agua"

Members
 Oscar Jimenez – vocals, guitar
 Vicente Sebastian – percussion
 Pat Harris – bass
 Michael Brown – saxophone, flute
 Simon Feranci – trumpet, trombone
 Nick Garbett – trumpet 
 Daniel Saddleton – drums
 Daniel Pliner – keyboards, vocals

Former members
 Simon Olsen – guitar
 Jared Kneale – drums

Discography

Albums

Awards and nominations

ARIA Music Awards
The ARIA Music Awards is an annual awards ceremony that recognises excellence, innovation, and achievement across all genres of Australian music. They commenced in 1987.

! 
|-
| 2008
| Tequila, Sangre y Fuego
| ARIA Award for Best World Music Album
| 
| 
|-

References

Australian world music groups
Musical groups established in 2005
Musical groups disestablished in 2015